Rohida fort / Vichitragad Fort is a fort located 10 km from Bhor, Pune district, of Maharashtra. This fort is an important fort in Pune district. The fort restoration is done by the Shree Shivdurga Samvardhan committee with the help of forest dept. and local villagers.

History
This fort was built during Yadava period. According to the inscription on the third gate, Mohammed Adil Shah of Bijapur had repaired this fort on May 1656. 

A Myth is rumored that Shivaji won the fort from the hands of Bandal-Deshmukh of Rohida in a close battle which resulted in the death of Krishnaji Bandal. After the battle, many officials along with Baji prabhu Deshpande, a chief administrator of Bandals, were inducted into the Swarajya movement. 

As a matter of the Fact is that Shivaji won the fort from the hands of The Adilshahi Kiledaar of the fort in 1656 whose name was Vitthal Mudgal it was not under the jurisdiction of Krishnaji Bandal Deshmukh who had died 8 years before in Year 1648.

His son Baaji Bandal was among the Bannermen of Shivaji before 1656 AD.

A story about Baji Prabhu Deshpande joining Shivaji after a Clash of swords in person which is also a lie.

This fight had never happened, moreover 10000 Bandal troops had joined Hindawi Swarajya Forces before in 1648.

Rohida was among the 23 forts Shivaji handed over to Mughals (to Aurangzeb) during the Treaty of Purandar(1665). On 24 June 1670, this fort was again captured by Shivaji . The Kanhoji Jedhe had patronage over the entire Bhor state and half of the Rohida Fort along with some patches of land. Further Mughals captured this fort. This fort was under the control of Pantsachiv of Bhor State, until Indian independence.

How to reach
The nearest town is Bhor which is 61 km from Pune. The base village of the fort is Bajarwadi which is 7 km from Bhor. There are good hotels at Bhor, now tea and snacks are also available in small hotels at Bajarwadi and Khanapur. The trekking path starts from the hillock west of the Bajarwadi Highschool. The route is very safe and wide. There are no trees on the trekking route. It takes about an hour to reach the entrance gate of the fort. The night stay on the fort can be made in the Rohidamalla temple on the fort. Bhairu bhiva Hawaldar rohida fort rakhwaldar. The villagers from the local fort restoration committee in the Bajarwadi make night stay and food arrangements at reasonable cost.

Places to see
There are three gates on the main entrance path of the fort. The main entrance gate has a Ganesh patti and Miharab. There is a rock cut water cistern near the second gate. The water is available round the year for drinking purpose. There are idols of Lion and Sharabha on the second gate. After climbing 57 steps the third gate is reached. There are idols of heads of elephants on either side and rock cut inscripture in Persian and Marathi on the outer side of the gate. There is a temple of Rohidamalla in good condition on the fort. There are seven Bastions on the fort, they are Shirawale Buruj, Patane buruj, Damugade buruj, Waghjai Buruj, Fatte Buruj and Sadar buruj. In some books presence of Shirja buruj is also mentioned, but its location is unknown. There is a series of rock-cut water cisterns on the southern side of the fort. It takes about an hour to visit all places on the fort.

See also 

 List of forts in Maharashtra
 List of forts in India
 Baji Prabhu Deshpande

References 

Buildings and structures of the Maratha Empire
Forts in Pune district
16th-century forts in India